The 2014 Columbus Lions season was the eighth season for the professional indoor football franchise and their third in the Professional Indoor Football League (PIFL). The Lions were one of eight teams that competed in the PIFL for the 2014 season.

The team played their home games under head coach Jason Gibson at the Columbus Civic Center in Columbus, Georgia. The Lions earned a 7–5 record, placing second in the league, falling to the Nashville Venom, 39–44, in the American Conference Championship.

Schedule
Key:

Regular season
All start times are local to home team

Postseason

Roster

Division standings

References

External links
2014 results

Columbus Lions
Columbus Lions
Columbus Lions